Pequod or Pequot may refer to:

The Pequod, or Pequot, a Native American people of Connecticut
Pequod (Moby-Dick), a whaleship that appears in Herman Melville's 1851 novel Moby-Dick
Pequod Glacier
Pequod Mountain, in British Columbia, Canada

See also
Pequot (disambiguation)